Gisèle Halimi (born Zeiza Gisèle Élise Taïeb; 27 July 1927 – 28 July 2020) was a Tunisian-French lawyer, politician, essayist and feminist activist.

Biography
Zeiza Gisèle Élise Taïeb was born in La Goulette, Tunisia, on 27 July 1927 to a practicing very modest Jewish Berber family (to Edouard et Fortunée dite "Fritna" Taïeb). She was educated at a French lycée in Tunis, and then attended the University of Paris, graduating in law and philosophy. Her childhood and the ways in which she blends a Jewish-Muslim identity are discussed in her memoir, Le lait de l'oranger. She was first married to Paul Halimi, and then to Claude Faux. She died the day after her 93rd birthday, on 28 July 2020.

Career
In 1948, Halimi qualified as a lawyer and, after eight years at the Tunis bar, moved to practise at the Paris bar in 1956. She acted as a counsel for the Algerian National Liberation Front, most notably for the activist Djamila Boupacha in 1960, who had been raped and tortured by French soldiers, and wrote a book in 1961 (with an introduction by Simone de Beauvoir) to plead her case. She also defended Basque individuals accused of crimes committed during the conflict in Basque Country, and was counsel in many cases related to women's issues, such as the 1972 Bobigny abortion trial (of a 17-year-old accused of procuring an abortion after having been raped), which attracted national attention.

In 1967, she chaired the Russell Tribunal, which was initiated by Bertrand Russell and Jean-Paul Sartre to investigate and evaluate American military action in Vietnam.

In 1971, she founded the feminist group Choisir to protect the women who had signed the Manifesto of the 343 admitting to having illegal abortions, of which she was one. In 1972 Choisir formed itself into a clearly reformist body, and the campaign greatly influenced the passing of the law allowing contraception and abortion carried through by Simone Veil in 1974.

In 1981, she was elected to the French National Assembly, as an independent Socialist, and was Deputy for Isère until 1984. Between 1985 and 1987 she was a French legate to UNESCO.

In 1998, she was a founding member of ATTAC.

Works

Footnotes

References
 An unlikely alliance. The Guardian, 12 August 2003. Accessed 2011-01-15.

Further reading
General Paul Aussaresses, The Battle of the Casbah: Terrorism and Counter-Terrorism in Algeria, 1955-1957. (New York: Enigma Books, 2010) .
Natalie Edwards, The Autobiographies of Julia Kristeva, Gisèle Halimi, Assia Djebar and Hélène Cixous : beyond "I" versus "we". (Chicago: Northwestern University, 2005) .

1927 births
2020 deaths
People from Tunis Governorate
Jewish activists
French essayists
French feminists
French abortion-rights activists
French socialists
Tunisian emigrants to France
Tunisian feminists
Tunisian Jews
Officiers of the Légion d'honneur
20th-century French women lawyers
20th-century French women writers
French women essayists
20th-century French lawyers
20th-century French women politicians
20th-century Tunisian women writers
20th-century Tunisian writers
Tunisian socialist feminists
Burials at Père Lachaise Cemetery
Berber feminists
Mizrahi feminists
French socialist feminists
Signatories of the 1971 Manifesto of the 343